WEEF (1430 AM) is a radio station licensed to Deerfield, Illinois.  The station broadcasts a multicultural ethnic format and is owned by Polnet Communications, Ltd.

History

MOR era
WEEF began broadcasting on August 15, 1963. The station was originally licensed to Highland Park, Illinois and ran 1,000 watts during daytime hours only. WEEF's call sign stood for "Eli E. Fink", the station's original owner. It originally aired a middle of the road (MOR) format. Until the mid 1970s, the station was simulcast on 103.1 WEEF-FM (later WVVX-FM). In December 1967, the station was sold to Unique Radio, along with 103.1 WEEF-FM, for $350,000.

Progressive rock era
In July 1972, the station's adopted a progressive rock format. In spring 1973, the station was sold to Vanguard Communications, along with 103.1 WEEF-FM, for $290,000, and its callsign was changed to WVVX.

Ethnic programming
By 1977, the station had adopted a multicultural ethnic format. On October 25, 1977, the station's callsign was changed to WQVQ. In 1978, the station was sold to Metroweb Corporation for $260,000. Its call sign was changed back to WEEF on February 12, 1979. In 1984, the station was sold to Gordon and Myra Winston for $500,000. In 1996, the station was sold to Leveton Communications for $835,000. In 2003, the station was sold to Polnet Communications for $1.1 million.

Translator
WEEF is also heard on an FM translator at 99.1 MHz.

References

External links
 

EEF
Radio stations established in 1963
1963 establishments in Illinois